Daryl MacDonald (born 20 November 1934) is a Canadian rower. He competed at the 1964 Summer Olympics and the 1968 Summer Olympics.

References

1934 births
Living people
Canadian male rowers
Olympic rowers of Canada
Rowers at the 1964 Summer Olympics
Rowers at the 1968 Summer Olympics
Rowers from St. Catharines
Commonwealth Games medallists in rowing
Commonwealth Games gold medallists for Canada
Rowers at the 1954 British Empire and Commonwealth Games
Medallists at the 1954 British Empire and Commonwealth Games